Orduluk (also Romanized as Ordūlūk; also known as Ardalook, Ardalūk, Ardūlak, Ordolūk, and Urduluk) is a village in Meyami Rural District, Razaviyeh District, Mashhad County, Razavi Khorasan Province, Iran. At the 2006 census, its population was 183, in 37 families.

References 

Populated places in Mashhad County